Nowlin is a surname. Notable people with the surname include:

Abner W. C. Nowlin (1833–1906), American politician
Eugenia Campbell Nowlin (1908–2003), American artist, arts administrator
James Robertson Nowlin (born 1937), American judge
Kiara Nowlin (born 1995), American gymnast
Stephen Nowlin, American artist
T.S. Nowlin, American screenwriter